Helin is a lake in Norway.

Helin may also refer to:

 Helin (surname)
 Helin, Poland, a village in Poland
 Helin, an historic name for Karakorum and Kharkhorin, Mongolia
 Helin, Sichuan (鹤林), a town in Qu County, Sichuan, China
 Helin, Chongqing (和林), a town in Chongqing, China
Helin, a Manchu general who died in battle attempting to suppress the White Lotus Rebellion.

See also
He Lin (disambiguation)